Alexandru Scripcenco (born 13 January 1991) is a Moldovan footballer who is playing Moldovan National Division for Dinamo-Auto as a defender. His contract with Sheriff was terminated by mutual consent on 27 February 2014. He has represented his country at under-21 international level.

References

1991 births
Living people
Moldovan footballers
Association football defenders
People from Tiraspol
FC Sheriff Tiraspol players
FC Iskra-Stal players
FC Tiraspol players
Moldovan Super Liga players
FC Florești players